Valérie von Martens (4 November 1894 – 7 April 1986), born Valérie Pajér Edle von Mayersperg, was a German-Austrian actress.

Valérie von Martens was born in Lienz, Tirol, daughter of the Austrian admiral Rudolf Pajér Edler von Mayersperg. She was an actress in Vienna when she had a relationship with the cabaret artist Karl Farkas.  In 1922 she met the actor Curt Goetz.  They married on 20 December 1923 in Berlin.  She then appeared with him on stage and screen, mainly in pieces written or directed by him. She co-directed the 1951 film The House in Montevideo with Goetz in which they featured in the lead roles.

She died in Riehen, Switzerland, and is buried in the Heerstrasse cemetery in Berlin, alongside her husband.

Works

 Die Verwandlung des Peterhans von Binningen (Memoirs Vol. 2', 1962)
 Wir wandern, wir wandern... ('Memoirs, Vol. 3', 1963)
 Die wunderbare und spannende Geschichte des Herrn Blau (1965)
 Das große Curt-Goetz-Album – Bilder eines Lebens (1968)
 Curt's Geschichten, Kurzgeschichten von und über Curt Goetz (1972)
 Curt Goetz – In deinem Sinne (1982)

Selected filmography
 In Thrall to the Claw (1921)
 Land of Love (1937)
 Napoleon Is to Blame for Everything (1938)
 Doctor Praetorius (1950)
 The House in Montevideo (1951)
 Hocuspocus (1953)

References

External links 

Valerie von Martens at the filmportal.de

www.curtgoetz.de Curt Goetz and Valerie von Martens
www.curt-goetz.at

1894 births
1986 deaths
German film actresses
German silent film actresses
Film directors from Berlin
German women film directors
People from Lienz
German stage actresses
Austrian women writers
Austrian stage actresses
Austrian film actresses
Austrian silent film actresses
20th-century German actresses
20th-century Austrian actresses
Edlers of Austria